The Living Century is an American biography television series that premiered on PBS on December 3, 2000. Each episode of the half-hour series documents the life of someone who is over 100 years old.  The Living Century was produced and distributed by Reverie Productions.

Episodes
The first two episodes are hosted by Jack Lemmon. The remaining episodes are hosted by Walter Cronkite.

Reception
"Three Miracles" won a 2001 Cine Golden Eagle award for a short form documentary, as well as a 2001 Platinum Remi Award for Best Television Documentary at the WorldFest-Houston International Film Festival.

References

External links
 
 
 

2000 American television series debuts
2003 American television series endings
2000s American documentary television series
PBS original programming